In mathematics, the symplectization of a contact manifold is a symplectic manifold which naturally corresponds to it.

Definition 

Let  be a contact manifold, and let . Consider the set
 
The union

The coorientable case 

Note that  is coorientable if and only if the bundle  is trivial. Any section of this bundle is a coorienting form for the contact structure.

Differential topology
Structures on manifolds
Symplectic geometry